Ali Asghar Yousefnejad (Persian: علی اصغر یوسف نژاد ) born 1959 in Sari, is an Iranian politician, secretary of the presidium of the Iranian parliament, a member of the fifth, eighth and tenth terms of the Iran Islamic parliament, and parliamentary deputy minister of economy.

See also 
 List of Iran's parliament representatives (10th term)

References

External links
Official website

Living people
1959 births
Iranian politicians
People from Mazandaran Province